The 2013–14 A-1 League was the 23rd season of the A-1 League, the highest professional basketball league in Croatia.

The first half of the season consisted of 10 teams and 90-game regular season. For second half of the season clubs was divided into two groups. Championship group consisted of 3 teams from ABA League and the best 5 teams from first half of the season. Relegation group consisted of bottom 5 teams from first half of the season.

For the first time in the history of the club, Cedevita were crowned the Croatian league title champions against Cibona with a 3–0 win in the final series.

Teams and venues
Relegated to A-2 Liga
Dubrovnik (14th)
Withdrew
Osječki sokol (12th)
Promoted from A-2 Liga
Šibenik (Champion)

Regular season

Source: Scoresway.com

Championship Round

Relegation and Promotion Rounds

Relegation Round

Promotion Round

Relegation/Promotion play-off
Relegation league 5th-placed team  faces the 2nd-placed Promotion league side  in a two-legged play-off. The winner on aggregate score after both matches will earn a spot in the 2014–15 A-1 League.

Gorica vs. Slavonski Brod

Slavonski Brod retained its A-1 League status.

Playoffs

Bracket

Semifinals
The semifinals are best-of-3 series.

Cedevita vs. Jolly JBŠ

Cibona vs. Zadar

Finals
The semifinals are best-of-5 series.

Cedevita vs. Cibona

External links
Official Site 
Scoresway Page
Eurobasket.com League Page

A-1 Liga seasons
Croatian
A1